The following elections occurred in the year 1954.

Africa
 French legislative by-election, 1954 (Guinea)
 1954 Southern Rhodesian general election
 1954 Gambian legislative election
 1954 Gold Coast legislative election

Asia
 1954 Iranian legislative election
 1954 Taiwan presidential election
 1954 Syrian parliamentary election

Europe
 1954 Belgian general election
 1954 Finnish parliamentary election
 1954 Irish general election
 1954 Soviet Union legislative election
 1954 Turkish general election
 1954 Luxembourgian legislative election

United Kingdom
 1954 Aberdare by-election
 1954 Armagh by-election
 1954 Inverness by-election

North America
 1954 British Honduras legislative election

Canada
 1954 Edmonton municipal election
 1954 Northwest Territories general election
 1954 Ottawa municipal election
 1954 Toronto municipal election

United States
 United States House of Representatives elections in California, 1954
 1954 California gubernatorial election
 1954 Maine gubernatorial election
 1954 Massachusetts gubernatorial election
 1954 Minnesota gubernatorial election
 1954 Pennsylvania gubernatorial election
 United States House of Representatives elections in South Carolina, 1954
 1954 South Carolina gubernatorial election
 1954 United States House of Representatives elections
 1954 United States Senate elections

United States Senate
 1954 United States Senate elections
 United States Senate election in Massachusetts, 1954
 United States Senate election in South Carolina, 1954

South America 
 1954 Argentine legislative and vice-presidential election
 1954 Brazilian legislative election
 1954 Guatemalan general election
 1954 Honduran general election
 1954 Salvadoran legislative election

Oceania
 1954 New Zealand general election
 1954 Australian federal election

See also

 
1954
Elections